Magnolia Cemetery is a historic rural cemetery in Charleston, South Carolina. The first board for the cemetery was assembled in 1849 with Edward C. Jones as the architect. It was dedicated in 1850; Charles Fraser delivered the dedication address. It was listed on the National Register of Historic Places as a Historic District in 1978.

The location of the cemetery had previously been a plantation known as Magnolia Umbra, the house of which was described as a newly built house with five rooms in 1820. The cemetery was constructed during 1850, on plans laid out by Edward C. Jones, and included a Gothic chapel also designed by Jones which no longer exists. The chapel, which was located near the central lake, remained under construction until early 1851. Both the chapel and the porter's lodge sustained very heavy damage during the cemetery's occupation by federal forces during the Civil War. The porter's lodge at the entrance was demolished in 1868, but the chapel continued to be used until at least 1876.

Notable interments
 William Aiken, Jr. (1806–1887), US Congressman, South Carolina Governor
 John Bennett (1865–1956), author and illustrator
 Thomas Bennett, Jr. (1781–1865), Governor of South Carolina
 William H. Brawley (1841–1916), U.S. Representative from South Carolina and United States federal judge
 Sallie F. Chapin (1830–1896), organized the Charleston Woman's Christian Temperance Union in 1881, the first in the state and served as first State president in 1883
 Langdon Cheves (1776–1857), American politician and a president of the Second Bank of the United States
 James Conner (general) (1829–1883), Confederate general in the American Civil War
 George E. Dixon (1837–1864), Commander of the Confederate submarine H.L. Hunley
 Frank Bunker Gilbreth, Jr. (1911–2001), author
 William J. Grayson (1788–1863), U.S. Representative from South Carolina
 Wilson Godfrey Harvey (1866–1932), Governor of South Carolina
 Daniel Elliott Huger (1779–1854), US Senator from South Carolina
 Horace Lawson Hunley (1823–1863), Confederate marine engineer, developer of early submarines
 Micah Jenkins (1835–1864), Confederate general
 Mitchell Campbell King (1815–1901), physician
 George Swinton Legaré (1869–1913), U.S. Representative from South Carolina
 Hugh S. Legaré (1797–1843), 16th U.S. Attorney General
 William Turner Logan (1874–1941), U.S. Representative from South Carolina
 Andrew Gordon Magrath (1813–1893), South Carolina Governor
 Burnet Rhett Maybank (1899–1954), US Senator, South Carolina Governor
 John Darlington Newcomer (1867–1931), American architect
 Josephine Pinckney (1895–1957), novelist and poet
 St. Julien Ravenel (1819–1882), physician and chemist
 Robert Rhett (1869–1913), U.S. Representative and Senator from South Carolina
 Roswell S. Ripley (1823–1887), Confederate general
 William Gilmore Simms (1806–1870), poet, novelist and historian
 Charles Henry Simonton (1829–1904), Confederate Colonel and federal judge on 4th Circuit Court of Appeals
 Julius Waties Waring (1880–1968), United States federal judge linked to the American Civil Rights Movement.
 Richard Smith Whaley (1874–1951), U.S. Representative from South Carolina
 British war graves of five Royal Navy and Merchant Navy personnel of World War II.

Gallery

References

Further reading

External links

 

Buildings and structures completed in 1850
Cemeteries on the National Register of Historic Places in South Carolina
1850 establishments in South Carolina
Historic districts on the National Register of Historic Places in South Carolina
National Register of Historic Places in Charleston, South Carolina
Geography of Charleston, South Carolina
Tourist attractions in Charleston, South Carolina
Protected areas of Charleston County, South Carolina
Cemeteries in Charleston, South Carolina
Rural cemeteries